The Saubach Formation is a geological formation in Austria and Germany, dating to about 180–174 million years ago. It was described originally as Saubachschichten in 1975, and classified as part of the Lower Jurassic Adnet Group.

Description 
This formation is part of a near-shore to epicontinental marine-influenced deposits, coeval in age with the Sachrang Formation, that was more likely a linked pelagic deposit. After the drowning of the local Rhaetian reef slope and in the adjacent basin, Sinemurian–Toarcian local members were formed as a sequence of increasingly near pelagic sedimentation during the middle and late Liassic. The Coeval on the lowermost part Scheck Member has evidence of a series of large scale tectonic activities culminating during the late Pliensbachian and early Toarcian, probably linked to the Vulcanism of the adjacent Irkut Basin.  In contrast to the "Adneter Mergel", the Saubach Formation lacks grey marls. In the type area, located at the Saubachgraben near  (largely destroyed and buried) consists of predominantly red sequences.  In some locations, such as Gaissau, the Saubach Formation is dominated by red condensed limestones with only minor marl intercalations. In 1997 the name Saubach Formation was suggested, representing originally a series of Green Bituminous Marls on the Unken Sincline, identical to the strata of the Saubach Member of the Adnet Group. Later it was shown that the Saubach Member and the Saubach formation belong to a unique entity, that can be called by both names, and represent a series of marls deposited on marginal marine to Pelagic environments, linked with the Red Marl of the Sachrang Formation.

Fossil content 
On Scheibelberg appears with a relatively sharp boundary of just banked and slightly bulbous, greenish gray, rarely also slightly reddish Marl overlaid with Limestone and marl. This sequence was interpreted as the main outcrop of the Saubach formation. Switched along these strata in the Saubach Formation are up to 5 m thick bitumen Marbles. There are fossils of Belemnnites, Ammonites and Echinoderms, where  Ostracodans and Foraminifera are only to be found very isolated. A group of Bioclastic wackestone is present, and consists of a micro-matrix with plenty of thin shell remains scattered loosely. Furthermore, are Echinoderm remains, Ostracodes, foraminifera, radiolaria and represented spiculae. Authentic Pyrite is found in patches to observe. There is an alternate deposition composed mostly by bioclastic wackestone with Echinoderm remains, and other with Mudstone, with abundant echinoderms, foraminifera, Gastropods, echinid spines and pebble spicules. A series of greenish-gray marl Lime facies is rich in Ammonites, including  the species Collina cf. gemma, linking the deposit to the Lower Toarcian. The Biota recovered on the Type strata of the formation suggest that the Saubach Formation was deposited with influence of deeper waters.

Sporomorphs
Several plant leaves and fragments of wood weren't identified.

Gastropoda

Cephalopoda

Crustacea

Ophiuroidea

Crinoidea

Holothuroidea

See also 
 List of fossiliferous stratigraphic units in Austria
 Toarcian turnover
 Toarcian formations

 Marne di Monte Serrone, Italy
 Calcare di Sogno, Italy
 Mizur Formation, North Caucasus
 Úrkút Manganese Ore Formation, Hungary
 Posidonia Shale, Lagerstätte in Germany
 Ciechocinek Formation, Germany and Poland
 Krempachy Marl Formation, Poland and Slovakia
 Djupadal Formation, Central Skane
 Lava Formation, Lithuania
 Azilal Group, North Africa
 Whitby Mudstone, England
 Fernie Formation, Alberta and British Columbia
 Poker Chip Shale
 Whiteaves Formation, British Columbia
 Navajo Sandstone, Utah
 Los Molles Formation, Argentina
 Mawson Formation, Antarctica
 Kandreho Formation, Madagascar
 Kota Formation, India
 Cattamarra Coal Measures, Australia

References 

Geologic formations of Austria
Jurassic System of Europe
Jurassic Austria
Toarcian Stage
Marl formations
Open marine deposits
Fossiliferous stratigraphic units of Europe
Paleontology in Austria